Pumawasi (Quechua (Quechua puma cougar, puma, wasi house, "puma house") is a rocky cave with pre-Columbian rock-art in Peru. It is situated in the Cusco Region, Anta Province, Chinchaypujio District. Pumawasi lies in the north of the district, west of the mountain Yuraqqaqa (Yurajaja, Yurajqaqa).

It was used as a burial ground, among other uses, as evidenced by human bone remains.

See also 
 Killarumiyuq
 Tampukancha
Qollmay

References

Archaeological sites in Cusco Region
Archaeological sites in Peru
Caves of Peru
Rock art in South America